The Coast-to-Coast Connector bicycle trail is a proposed 250 mile bicycle and multi-use trail across Florida. The trail would provide a path connecting the Gulf of Mexico on peninsular Florida's west coast to the Atlantic Ocean on Florida's east coast. Legislation in support of the planned trail passed the Florida House of Representatives in April 2014 and would fund it with $15.5 million. Florida State Senator Andy Gardiner of Orlando is one of the plan's leading supporters. Legislation funding the trail with $50 million was vetoed in 2013 by Governor Rick Scott in 2013. The funding would be used close gaps in the trail route. The estimated cost of the project is $45 million. It would incorporate existing public spaces and trails including:

Fred Marquis Pinellas Trail
Starkey Trail
Suncoast Trail
Good Neighbor Trail
Withlacoochee State Trail
General James A. Van Fleet State Trail
South Lake Trail
West Orange Trail
Clarcona-Ocoee Trail
Pine Hills Trail
Seminole-Wekiva Trail
Rinehart Trail
Spring to Spring Trail
East Central Regional Rail Trail

References

External links
Coast to Coast Connector Florida Greenways & Trails Foundation
 Florida Coast to Coast Trail at 100 Florida Trails  

Rail trails in Florida
Hiking trails in Florida
Bike paths in Florida